Symptomatic is the act of displaying characteristics of a disease. 

Symptomatic may also refer to:

 Symptomatic (album), by Airlock, 2004
 "Symptomatic", a 2021 song by Peach PRC

See also
 
 Symptom (disambiguation)